Admiral Sir Douglas Blake Fisher  (23 October 1890 – 4 October 1963) was a Royal Navy officer who went on to be Fourth Sea Lord.

Naval career
Fisher joined the Royal Navy as a Midshipman in 1907 and served in World War I. He was appointed Captain of the Fleet for the Home Fleet in 1938. He also served in World War II commanding the battleship HMS Warspite from 1940 and then taking part in the Arctic Convoys from 1942 before becoming Rear Admiral, Fleet Train for the British Pacific Fleet in 1944 and then Flag Officer, Western Area, British Pacific Fleet in 1945. After the War he became Fourth Sea Lord and Chief of Supplies and Transport and then retired as a full Admiral in 1949.

References

External links

1890 births
1963 deaths
Royal Navy admirals of World War II
Knights Commander of the Order of the Bath
Knights Commander of the Order of the British Empire
Lords of the Admiralty
People educated at Stubbington House School